Maulets may refer to:

 Maulets (history), Valencian supporters of Archduke Charles during the War of the Spanish Succession.
 Maulets (politics), a Catalan pro-independence youth political organization.